is a railway station on the Kagoshima Main Line operated by Kyushu Railway Company in Kagoshima, Kagoshima, Japan.

The station opened on March 14, 2009.

Lines 
Kyushu Railway Company
Kagoshima Main Line

JR

Adjacent stations

References 

Railway stations in Kagoshima Prefecture
Railway stations in Japan opened in 2009